Başaran may refer to:

Places
 Başaran, Eskil, village in Aksaray Province, Turkey
 Başaran, Kuyucak, town in Aydın Province, Turkey

People
 Gönül Başaran Erönen (born 1953), Cypriot judge
 Hüseyin Başaran (sports commentator) (1958–2015), Turkish sports commentator
 Mina Başaran (1990–2018), Turkish Businesswoman
 İrfan Başaran (born 1989), Turkish footballer
 Tunç Başaran (1938–2019), Turkish film director
 Cemal Basaran, Professor of Engineering Mechanics, University at Buffalo

Other

 The 9th Colossus in Shadow of the Colossus

Turkish-language surnames